Haplophryne mollis, the ghostly seadevil or soft leftvent angler, is a species of anglerfish in the family Linophrynidae and is the only species in the genus Haplophryne.

Description
As in other angler fish, the front dorsal fin is replaced by a lure (illicium or esca) that protrudes forward and over the mouth to attract prey, but in this species this just consists of a flap of skin and there is no "fishing rod". The fish has spine-like ornamentation above the eyes and at the corners of the jaws. The head is large and angular, with a very wide mouth armed with numerous small teeth in both jaws. The dorsal fin, which has no spines but consists of three soft rays, is set far back on the body; the anal fin also has three soft rays and the tail is rounded.

Unlike most other deepsea anglerfish, H. mollis lacks pigmentation, and both sexes appear pallid and translucent, with the musculature and portions of the skeleton clearly showing through the skin. Juvenile females lack the spinous ornamentation on the head.

Distribution
Because of the great depths at which this fish lives, it is seldom encountered by humans. In 2009 it was reported that 88 known female specimens had been observed. The type specimen was described by the German zoologist August Brauer in 1902 from the Indian Ocean. Another Indian Ocean specimen was a free-living male caught off Western Australia. Other specimens have been trawled from the Atlantic Ocean, the Caribbean Sea and the Gulf of Mexico, between 55°N and 40°S. Further specimens have been found in the Pacific Ocean off eastern Australia, New Caledonia and New Zealand, with isolated findings near Hawaii and in the Gulf of Panama.

Life cycle and ecology
Male H. mollis are at first free-living, but when they have found a female they latch onto her with their teeth. In most anglerfish the point of attachment for the male is on the belly, close to the anus, but in H. mollis the attachment site can be anywhere on the head or body, and in one case, a male attached to the female's esca (lure). The males orient themselves in random directions, and there may be more than one male per female. A papilla, or conical fleshy protuberance, grows at the site of attachment which may assist the male to establish a good grip. The mouth of the male is partially blocked by the papilla, but an opening usually remains at either side which suffices for allowing a flow of water over the gills. As time passes, the male becomes fused to the female and their tissues combine. The male can be considered as a parasite of the female but only about 30% of mature females encountered have an attached male, so many females may never encounter a mate, and remain in a solitary, non-reproductive state for the duration of their lives.

References

External links 

Linophrynidae
Marine fish
Fish described in 1902
Taxa named by August Brauer
Monotypic vertebrate genera
Monotypic fish genera
Monotypic marine fish genera
Monotypic ray-finned fish genera